The Waqf of Ibshir Mustafa Pasha (AR: وقف ابشير باشا) is a sizeable 17th century endowment complex built by wazir Ipshir Mustafa Pasha in 1652 who was then governor of Aleppo.  It has been described as of the largest and most interesting building complexes to be erected in Aleppo during Ottoman times.

Background 

The Ibshir Mustafa Pasha Waqf complex is one of a number of notable historic structures built in 17th century Aleppo.  The complex included a khan, three qaysariyya, textile looms and dye workshop, a souk, bread ovens, a sebil and a coffee-house noted for its fine decorations.  The qaysariyyas in this area of Aleppo specialized in textile manufacturing.  They were active until the late 20th century.    

The Bahram Pasha waqf hammam's lies in an adjacent building.  They provided a shared 'public' space and commercial opportunity for local Christian and Muslim inhabitants and led to its neighbourhood of Al-Jdayde to become Aleppo's second economic centre.  Aleppo's Beit Ghazaleh and Beit Ajikbash museums lie adjacent to the waqf complex.

The coffeehouse hall of the waqf complex of Ibshir Mustafa Pasha is one of the largest non-commercially used spaces of Ottoman Aleppo.

Recent developments 
The complex suffered damage from street fighting and intermittent shelling throughout Syria's civil war.  In particular, a series of underground explosions that occurred in April 2015 devastated the building and surrounding area.  The elaborate facade of the hall of the coffee-house, as well as its first row of vaults, were destroyed during the war.  

The waqf complex is listed as one of 25 most significant restoration sites proposed for the Ancient City of Aleppo.

Further reading 

 David, Jean-Claude. Le waqf d’Ipšīr Pāšā à Alep (1063/1653): Étude d’urbanisme historique. Avec la collaboration de Bruno Chauffert-Yvart. Damascus: Presses de l'Ifpo, 1982. (in French)
 L.I.S.A.teamwork Gerda Henkel Stiftung (2017) The Waqf of Ibshir Mustafa Pasha | وقف ابشير باشا (in English)
 Watenpaugh, Heghnar Zeitlian.(2004) The Image of an Ottoman City: Imperial Architecture and Urban Experience in Aleppo in the 16th and 17th Centuries. Leiden: Brill
 Die Organisation des religiösen Raums in Aleppo. Die Rolle der islamischen religiösen Stiftungen (auqāf) in der Gesellschaft einer Provinzhauptstadt des Osmanischen Reiches an der Wende zum 19. Jahrhundert. Beirut: Orient-Institut Beirut, 2009. (in German)
 Jean-Claude David, Thierry Boissière. (2014) La destruction du patrimoine culturel à Alep : banalité d’unfait de guerre?. Confluences [en] Méditerranée, l’Harmattan 2014/2 N.89 pp.163-171 (in French)
 Stefan Knost (2015) The Christian Communities in Ottoman Aleppo and the Role of Religious Endowments (Waqf), in: Hidemitsu Kuroki (ed.), Human Mobility and Multi-ethnic Coexistence in Middle Eastern Societies 1, pp. 41-57.

Gallery

References

External links
The waqf in the city

Buildings and structures in Aleppo

Aleppo
Architecture in Syria
Jdeydeh quarter
Lists of religious buildings and structures in Syria